Jean Ter-Merguerian (Marseille, 5 October 1935 – Marseille, 29 September 2015) was a French-Armenian virtuoso violinist and violin pedagogue.

Biography
Jean Ter-Merguerian has got the first prize for violin at the Marseille Conservatoire at the age of 11. In the same year, his first recital took place, where he performed Vivaldi's Concerto in A minor and Mendelssohn's Concerto in E minor with conductor André Audoli.
In 1947 he immigrated in Soviet Armenia, where he continued his musical studies in Yerevan with prof. Karp Dombaïev and then in the Moscow Conservatory in the class of David Oistrakh.
Jean Ter-Merguerian is a prizewinner of international violin competitions, such as Prague Spring (1956), Tchaikovsky Competition in Moscow, Queen Elisabeth in Bruxelles (1963). He also got the first Grand Prix at the Long-Thibaud Competition in Paris (1961).
Along with his concert activities, in ex-USSR, Western Europe, Lebanon, South America, the United States, and Canada, he gave lectures at the Yerevan Komitas State Conservatory. He got the title of "People's Artist of the Armenian SSR". In 1981 he moved to his birthplace of Marseille.

In 1975, during his USA tour, he played in Boston the Violin Concerto by Brahms; The story goes that, at the conclusion of the concert, the conductor Arthur Fiedler, who was very hard to please and given to lavishing praise, embraced the young violinist on stage with paternal love and wished him success. This was the ringing endorsement of the talent of Jean Ter Merguerian, who had just given his first performance in the United States.

His solo performances were accompanied by orchestras of different countries conducted by famous conductors, also Aram Khachaturian having conducted his own violin concerto.
Jean Ter-Merguerian was also member of juries of international competitions: "Paganini" in Genoa, Italy, "Sarasate" in Pamplona, Spain, "Tchaikovsky" in Moscow and "Khachaturian" in Yerevan.
He lived in France, giving master classes there and abroad. He played on a Nicolò Amati violin.
Jean Ter-Merguerian died of cancer, after a long illness at his home, in Marseille, on 29 September 2015. He is survived by his wife, the pianist Lilia, his son Vagram and his daughter.

Bibliography
 Jean Ter-Merguerian - L'Âme du violon (Ջութակի հոգին / Violin's soul), 176 pages, 2012, Armenian, Russian, French |

Quotes from colleagues (in original language)

 „J'ai une grande admiration pour Jean. Sa sonorité, sa technique et sa musicalité sont parfaites. ...C'est un très grand artiste, un violoniste sensationnel...“ (Zino Francescatti)
 „Le violoniste le plus doué de sa génération.“ (Henryk Szeryng)
 „Jean Ter-Merguerian n'est pas seulement un grand violoniste, il est un grand artiste.“ (Christian Ferras)
 „La pus belle technique d'archet du monde tout instrument à corde confondu.“ (Mstislav Rostropovitch)
 „Jean Ter-Merguerian is a gentleman among violinists. He has extraordinary technical skills and a deep musicality.“ (Jonathan Dove, The Strad)

Recordings
No official recital and concerts recordings by Jean Ter-Merguerian exists. Only two CD-Rs of live and archive broadcast material have been released (CD-R 1 : "Selection from Performances" / CD-R 2 : "Khachaturian 100th"). The 1966 Armenian Radio broadcast recording of Bach Double Concerto is part of a 2CDs compilation dedicated to his colleague, the violinist Anahit Tsitsikian. In 1999 Jean Ter-Merguerian recorded his only commercial release: Gérard Gasparian's Violin Sonata (1990), with the composer himself at the piano (CD Timpani 1C1055).
Armenian Radio TV archives are full of Jean Ter-Merguerian's recordings, yet to be discovered.
In 2020 Rhine Classics label has released a 5CD box dedicated to his art "The soul of violin":
RH-016 | 5CD | JEAN TER-MERGUERIAN - violin’s soul

Live, private, radio TV archives, uncommercial

References 

1935 births
20th-century French male classical violinists
2015 deaths
French people of Armenian descent
Musicians from Marseille
Armenian violinists
French emigrants to Armenia
Tchaikovsky Secondary Music School alumni
Moscow Conservatory alumni